George Frideric Handel is reported to have had a great love for painting, and until his eyesight failed him, he enjoyed viewing collections of pictures that were for sale. He owned a large art collection consisting of at least seventy paintings and ten prints, including landscapes; ruins; hunting, historical, marine and battle scenes; erotica; and a few Biblical paintings and portraits.

Artworks
The paintings and prints in Handel's collection (that weren't bequeathed in his will) were auctioned by Abraham Langford a little over ten months after his death (the auction catalogue was dated 27–28 February 1760).

Auction
The auction of Handel's art collection occurred on 28 February 1760. The sale catalogue listed the following items:

References

George Frideric Handel
British art collectors
Private art collections